Huai Kha  is a tambon (subdistrict) located in the northwestern region of Buntharik district, in Ubon Ratchathani Province, Thailand. In 2021, it had a population of 17,799 people. Neighbouring subdistricts are (clockwise from the west) Na Chaluai, Sok Saeng, Non Kho, and Phon Ngam, as well as Soukhoumma and Mounlapamok districts of Laos in the east and south.

History
Around the early 1800s, several ethnic groups, including Thai, Laotian, and Khmer, as well as an indigenous minority, the Kuy, evacuated from Ban Sang Ngon (บ้านสร้างโหง่น), Ban Pho Dao (บ้านโพเด้า), and Ban Kon Sao Nong Kung (บ้านก้อนเส้าหนองกุง) of Khukhan, currently in Sisaket province,  to settle in the area, which was formerly covered with deciduous dipterocarp forest. The first settlement was named "Huai Kha," after Alpinia galanga, which was found numerously in the region, especially in the waterside area; Huai ห้วย means "stream, creek, brook," and Kha ข่า refers to "Alpinia galanga".

Huai Kha was one of the three oldest subdistricts (tambon) of the Buntharik district, together with Phon Ngam and Kho Laen. In 1979, the tambon's village in the northwestern area, Non Kho, became an independent subdistrict with the same name, by absorbing five other villages in the surrounding area.

Initially, Huai Kha subdistrict was governed by its subdistrict council until the council was promoted to the Subdistrict Administrative Organization (SAO) on January 20, 1996.

Geography
The tambon covers 573 km2 and is located in the southernmost region of the Buntharik district. The northwest area, one-third of the total, is an undulating plateau where most of its population settled, while the remaining area is a rolling plain and highland of the Dângrêk Mountains, which form the border between Thailand and Laos.

Administration
The subdistrict of Huai Kha is divided into 20 villages (mubans; หมู่บ้าน), three of which, Huai Kha, Nong Mek, and Sang Hom villages, each was further divided into two community group (หมู่; Mu). As of the 2021 census, it had a population of 17,799 people with 5,558 households.

Since 1997, the Subdistrict Administrative Organization of Huai Kha Subdistrict Municipality (องค์การบริหารส่วนตำบลห้วยข่า, Huai Kha SAO) has been the local government responding to administer the area.

The following is a list of the subdistrict's mubans, which roughly correspond to the villages.

References

Tambon of Ubon Ratchathani Province